Abdul Hafeez Al Yousefi (1937 – February 14, 2020), was an Agricultural Adviser to Zayed bin Sultan Al Nahyan (Founder of United Arab Emirates).

Early life
Al Yousefi was born in British India (now India), before his family migrated to Karachi, Pakistan along with many others after the Independence of Pakistan.

Education and career
Al Yousefi moved to Beirut where he studied for a Graduate Degree in Agricultural Sciences from the American University of Beirut.

During the same time in 1962, Sheikh Zayed, then the former  Ruler's Representative for the Eastern Region of Trucial States, had turned to international diplomacy in his efforts to find someone to develop Al Ain’s agriculture. Sir Hugh Boustead, the British political agent in Abu Dhabi, contacted Dr Jack Eyre, an agriculture adviser to the Middle East development division at the British Embassy in Beirut, requesting a candidate. Eventually Al Yousefi was selected. In May 2015, Al Yousefi published his book "50 years in Al Ain Oasis", and dedicated it to Sheikh Zayed during the 2015 Abu Dhabi International Book Fair.

Later life
Al Yousefi remained in UAE after a good friendship bond was developed between him and Sheikh Zayed. He lived in his Al Ain house which was built for him by Sheikh Zayed, it was also the first proper house built in UAE.

Death
Al Yousefi died in Al Ain after suffering from Leukemia for some years

References

1937 births
2020 deaths
Emirati agronomists
Pakistani emigrants to the United Arab Emirates
American University of Beirut alumni